Service après-vente des émissions, also known as SAV des émissions, is a French short comedy television series hosted by the comic duo Omar and Fred (Omar Sy and Fred Testot) from 2005 to 2012 on Canal+. The show was a segment of Le Grand Journal, a news show then-hosted by Michel Denisot. Each episode was rebroadcast the following morning on Virgin Radio.

The series
 The SAV des émissions is a receiving calling center. The basic concept is to comment on the news in a succession of short scenes. Over the years, the series also gained a number of recurring characters, interpreted by either Omar or Fred. Instead of commenting on the news, each of these usually has their own running gag and catchphrases.
 Each gag begins with Omar or Fred picking up the phone and saying "Service après-vente, bonjour !". The other plays a character calling the SAV to ask a question.
 The series often uses surreal humor, either with the costumes or the dialogue.
 At first, the SAV was a segment in 20h10 pétantes, a program hosted by Stéphane Bern from 2005 until 2006. From 2006, the SAV was included daily in Le Grand Journal of Michel Denisot except on football nights.

References

Parody television series
French satirical television shows
French television sketch shows
Surreal comedy television series
2005 French television series debuts